Noveltoons is a series of cartoons produced by Paramount Pictures' Famous Studios from 1943 to the end of the studio during 1967. The series was known for bringing the characters from Harvey Comics to life, such as Casper the Friendly Ghost, Wendy the Good Little Witch, Herman and Katnip, Little Audrey, and Baby Huey. All shorts from Baby Huey and Little Audrey are included. It was the successor to the series Color Classics produced by Fleischer Studios. Several Noveltoons feature characters which originated in Color Classics. This series was also similar to the two series from Warner Bros., Looney Tunes and Merrie Melodies, in that it features several recurring characters with one general title.

In 1956, Paramount sold all of the pre-October 1950 Noveltoons (ending with Saved by the Bell) to television distributor U.M. & M. TV Corporation. Shortly afterward, UM&M's assets were acquired by National Telefilm Associates. In the 1980s, NTA changed its name to Republic Pictures, and after a brief period of ownership by Spelling Entertainment in 1994, was acquired by Paramount's parent company Viacom, which placed the cartoons back in Paramount's control (Republic Pictures has been renamed Melange Pictures since 2013). 

Later in 1962, Paramount sold the Post-Oct 1950 to pre-March 1962 Noveltoons (beginning with Mice Meeting You and ending with T.V. or No T.V.) to Harvey Comics, which was in turn purchased by Classic Media in 2001. Classic Media was purchased by DreamWorks Animation in 2012 (and briefly renamed it DreamWorks Classics), who in 2016 was purchased by Comcast's NBCUniversal and currently distributed by Universal Pictures.

Paramount continues to own the post-March 1962 Noveltoons.

Filmography

1940s
{|class="wikitable sortable"
!style="width:3em"|#
!style="width:15em"|Title
!style="width:12em"|Original release date
!style="width:12em"|Reissue release date
!style="width:12em"|Direction
!style="width:18em"|Animation
!style="width:12em"|Story
!style="width:12em"|Scenics
!style="width:12em"|Characters
!style="width:12em"|Lyrics
!style="width:12em"|Narration
!style="width:12em"|Music
!style="width:12em"|Notes
!Video if in the public domain
|-
|1
|No Mutton fer Nuttin'''
|November 26, 1943
|
|Dan Gordon (uncredited)
|Dave TendlarJohn Walworth
|Carl Meyer
|
|Blackie and Wolfie
|
|
|Sammy Timberg 
|First Noveltoon cartoon, only Noveltoon recorded with Western Electric Sound in Miami, Florida, and first appearances of Blackie the Lamb and Wolfie Wolf. First cartoon directed by Dan Gordon.
|
|-
|2
|The Henpecked Rooster|February 18, 1944
|
|Seymour Kneitel
|Orestes CalpiniReuben Grossman
|Jack WardJack Mercer 
|
|Herman and Henry
|
|
|Winston Sharples 
|First appearances of Herman, Henry, and Bertha. First cartoon directed by Seymour Kneitel. First Noveltoon cartoon with directorial credit, and first Noveltoon recorded with RCA Sound System in New York City.
|
|-
|3
|Cilly Goose|March 24, 1944
|March 10, 1950
|Seymour Kneitel
|Graham PlaceAbner Kneitel
|Joe Stultz
|
|
|
|
|Winston Sharples
|First Noveltoon series short where the solo character speaks. Copyright renewed in 1972.
|
|-
|4
|Suddenly It's Spring|April 28, 1944
|December 2, 1949
|Seymour Kneitel
|Orestes CalpiniOtto Feuer
|
|
|Raggedy Ann
|
|
|Winston Sharples
|Second cartoon based on Johnny Gruelle's Raggedy Ann character, after the Fleischer Studios cartoon Raggedy Ann and Raggedy Andy.
|
|-
|5
|Yankee Doodle Donkey|October 27, 1944
|May 5, 1950
|I. Sparber
|Nick TafuriTom Golden
|Jack MercerJack Ward
|
|Spunky
|
|
|Sammy Timberg
|Featuring Spunky, an alumnus from the Color Classics series produced by Fleischer Studios. First cartoon directed by Izzy Sparber.
|
|-
|6
|Gabriel Churchkitten|December 15, 1944
|
|Seymour Kneitel
|Graham PlaceLou ZukorGeorge CannataJoe Oriolo
|
|Robert Little
|
|
|
|Winston Sharples
|Based on three books by Margot Austin. Copyright renewed in 1971.
|
|-
|7
|When G.I Johnny Comes Home|February 2, 1945
|
|Seymour Kneitel
|Al EugsterOtto Feuer
|Jack WardBill Turner
|Robert Little
|
|
|
|Winston Sharples
|First use of the Bouncing Ball in an animated cartoon since 1938.
|
|-
|8
|Scrappily Married|March 30, 1945
|
|Seymour Kneitel
|Orestes CalpiniOtto Feuer
|Carl MeyerJack Ward
|Anton Loeb
|Herman and Henry
|
|
|Winston Sharples
|
|
|-
|9
|A Lamb in a Jam|May 4, 1945
|
|I. Sparber
|Dave TendlarJohn Gentillela
|Joe StultzCarl Meyer
|
|Blackie and Wolfie
|
|
|Winston Sharples
|
|
|-
|10
|A Self-Made Mongrel|June 29, 1945
|
|Dan Gordon (uncredited)
|Dave TendlarJohn Walworth
|Carl Meyer
|
|Dog Face
|
|
|Winston Sharples
|First appearance of Dog Face. Second and final Noveltoon directed by Dan Gordon.
|
|-
|11
|The Friendly Ghost|November 16, 1945
|October 1, 1954
|I. Sparber
|Nick TafuriJohn WalworthTom Golden
|Bill TurnerOtto Messmer
|Shane Miller
|Casper the Friendly Ghost
|
|Frank Gallop
|Winston Sharples
|First appearance of Casper the Friendly Ghost, and also his first short in the Noveltoons series, and the only short based on the 1939 book of the same name.
|
|-
|12
|Cheese Burglar|February 22, 1946
|October 2, 1953
|I. Sparber
|Jim TyerBen SolomonWilliam Henning
|Carl MeyerJoe Stultz
|
|Herman
|
|
|Winston Sharples
|Herman's first solo appearance.Clips of the episode were featured on the 2013 Brooklyn Puppet Conspiracy reboot of The Fuzz|
|-
|13
|Old MacDonald Had a Farm|June 7, 1946
|
|Seymour Kneitel
|Orestes CalpiniOtto Feuer
|Bill TurnerOtto Messmer
|Robert Little
|
|
|
|Winston Sharples
|A sing-a-long with the Bouncing Ball.
|
|-
|14
|Sheep Shape|June 28, 1946
|
|I. Sparber
|Dave TendlarJohn Gentilella
|Joe Stultz
|
|Blackie and Wolfie
|
|
|Winston Sharples
|
||
|-
|15
|The Goal Rush|September 27, 1946
|
|I. Sparber
|Dave TendlarGeorge Germanetti
|I. KleinJack Ward
|Robert Little
|
|
|Ward Wilson
|Winston Sharples
|A sing-a-long with the Bouncing Ball.
|
|-
|16
|Spree for All|October 4, 1946
|
|Seymour Kneitel
|Jim TyerWilliam Henning
|Bill TurnerOtto Messmer
|
|Snuffy Smith
|
|
|Winston Sharples
|Featuring Snuffy Smith from the comic strip Barney Google and Snuffy Smith. Previously considered a lost cartoon, and can currently only in black and white format. Only Noveltoon produced in Cinecolor.Only Snuffy Smith cartoon released under the Noveltoon series.
|
|-
|17
|Sudden Fried Chicken|October 18, 1946
|October 1, 1954
|Bill Tytla
|Orestes CalpiniOtto Feuer
|Carl MeyerJack Ward
|
|Herman and Henry
|
|
|Winston Sharples
|Final Herman and Henry cartoon.This cartoon appeared in Smart House. First cartoon directed by Bill Tytla.
|
|-
|18
|The Stupidstitious Cat|April 25, 1947
|October 2, 1953
|Seymour Kneitel
|Graham PlaceJohn Walworth
|Carl MeyerJack Ward
|Anton Loeb
|Buzzy the Crow
|
|
|Winston Sharples
|First appearance of Buzzy the Crow.
|
|-
|19
|The Enchanted Square|May 9, 1947
|October 2, 1953
|Seymour Kneitel
|Orestes CalpiniAl Eugster
|Shane MillerOrestes Calpini
|Shane Miller
|Raggedy Ann
|
|
|Winston Sharples
|Third and final cartoon based on Johnny Gruelle's Raggedy Ann character.
|
|-
|20
|Madhattan Island|June 27, 1947
|
|Seymour Kneitel
|
|I. Klein
|Robert Little
|
|
|Kenneth Roberts
|Winston Sharples
|A sing-a-long with the Bouncing Ball, first Noveltoon without animation credits.
|
|-
|21
|Much Ado About Mutton|July 25, 1947
|October 2, 1953
|I. Sparber
|Dave TendlarTom Golden
|Joe StultzCarl Meyer
|Anton Loeb
|Blackie and Wolfie
|
|
|Winston Sharples
|Last appearance of Blackie the Lamb in the Noveltoon series. He would later appear in the Screen Song The Circus Comes to Clown.
|
|-
|22
|The Wee Men|August 8, 1947
|October 2, 1953
|Bill Tytla
|Al EugsterSteve MuffattiGeorge Germanetti
|Ewald LudwigI. KleinJack Ward
|Robert Little
|Paddy the Leprechaun
|Buddy KayeDick Manning
|
|Winston Sharples
|
|
|-
|23
|The Mild West|August 22, 1947
|
|Seymour Kneitel
|Tom JohnsonGeorge Germanetti
|Bill TurnerLarry Riley
|Anton Loeb
|
|
|
|Winston Sharples
|A sing-a-long with the Bouncing Ball.
|
|-
|24
|Naughty but Mice|October 10, 1947
|
|Seymour Kneitel
|Dave TendlarAl Eugster
|Bill TurnerLarry Riley
|Robert Owen
|Herman
|
|
|Winston Sharples
|
|
|-
|25
|Santa's Surprise|December 7, 1947
|October 1, 1954
|Seymour Kneitel
|Myron WaldmanWm.B. Pattengill
|Larz Bourne
|Robert Little
|Little Audrey
|Buddy Kaye
|
|Winston Sharples
|First appearance of Little Audrey and also her first short in the Noveltoon series.
|
|-
|26
|Cat O' Nine Ails|January 9, 1948
|
|Seymour Kneitel
|
|Carl Meyer  Joe Stultz
|
|Buzzy
|
|
|Winston Sharples
|A lost cartoon. Only known print stored at UCLA Film and Television Archive.
|
|-
|27
|Flip Flap|February 13, 1948
|
|I. Sparber
|Myron WaldmanWm.B. Pattengill
|Bee LewiMickey Klar MarksJoe StultzLarry Riley
|Robert Little
|
|
|Ken Roberts (uncredited)
|Winston Sharples
|Only Noveltoon produced in Polacolor.
|
|-
|28
|We're in the Honey|March 19, 1948
|October 1, 1954
|Bill Tytla
|George GermanettiSteve Muffatti
|I. KleinJack Mercer
|Anton Loeb
|
|Buddy Kaye
|
|Winston Sharples
|
|
|-
|29
|The Bored Cuckoo|April 9, 1948
|October 1, 1954
|Bill Tytla
|George GermanettiSteve Muffatti
|Bunny GoughBill TurnerLarry Riley
|Robert Connavale
|
|
|
|Winston Sharples
|
|
|-
|30
|There's Good Boos Tonight|April 23, 1948
|
|I. Sparber
|Myron WaldmanMorey RedenNick Tafuri
|Bill TurnerLarry Riley
|Anton Loeb
|Casper the Friendly Ghost
|
|Frank Gallop
|Winston Sharples
|Second appearance of Casper in the Noveltoon series
|
|-
|31
|The Land of the Lost|May 7, 1948
|
|I. Sparber
|Myron WaldmanNick Tafuri
|Isabel Manning Hewson (original)
Larz BourneBill Turner (adaption)
|Anton Loeb
|Isabel and Billy
|
|
|Winston Sharples
|First of three animated shorts based on the then-popular children's fantasy adventure radio series of the same name.
|
|-
|32
|Butterscotch and Soda|June 4, 1948
|October 1, 1954
|Seymour Kneitel
|Al EugsterBill HudsonIrving Spector
|Larz BourneBill Turner
|Robert Owen
|Little Audrey
|Buddy Kaye
|
|Winston Sharples
|
|
|-
|33
|The Mite Makes Right|October 15, 1948
|September 30, 1955
|Bill Tytla
|George GermanettiSteve Muffatti
|I. Klein
|Anton Loeb
|
|
|
|Winston Sharples
|
|
|-
|34
|Hector's Hectic Life|November 19, 1948
|
|Bill Tytla
|George GermanettiSteve Muffatti
|Joe StultzLarry Riley
|Robert Connavale
|Hector
|
|
|Winston Sharples
|
|
|-
|35
|The Old Shell Game|December 17, 1948
|September 30, 1955
|Seymour Kneitel
|Dave TendlarTom Golden
|Joe StultzLarry Riley
|Robert Connavale
|
|
|
|Winston Sharples
|
|
|-
|36
|The Little Cut-Up|January 21, 1949
|September 30, 1955
|I. Sparber
|Myron WaldmanGeorge Whittier
|I. KleinM. Marks
|Anton Loeb
|
|
|
|Winston Sharples
|
|
|-
|37
|Hep Cat Symphony|February 4, 1949
|September 30, 1955
|Seymour Kneitel
|Dave TendlarMarty Taras
|Carl MeyerJack Mercer
|Tom Ford
|
|
|
|Winston Sharples
|
||
|-
|38
|The Lost Dream|March 18, 1949
|
|Bill Tytla
|George GermanettiHarvey Patterson
|Steve MuffattiBill TurnerLarz Bourne
|Shane Miller
|Little Audrey
|
|
|Winston Sharples
|
|
|-
|39
|Little Red School Mouse|April 15, 1949
|
|I. Sparber
|Tom JohnsonJohn Gentilella
|Carl MeyerJack Mercer
|Robert Connavale
|
|
|
|Winston Sharples
|
|
|-
|40
|A Haunting We Will Go|May 13, 1949
|
|Seymour Kneitel
|Myron WaldmanIrving Dressler
|Larz Bourne
|Anton Loeb
|Casper the Friendly Ghost
|
|Frank Gallop
|Winston Sharples
|Last appearance of Casper in the Noveltoons series, before the character was given his own series.
|
|-
|41
|A Mutt in a Rutt|May 27, 1949
|
|I. Sparber
|Dave TendlarTom Golden
|Carl MeyerJack Mercer
|Robert Little
|Dog Face
|
|
|Winston Sharples
|Second and final appearance of Dog Face.
|
|-
|42
|Campus Capers|July 1, 1949
|
|Bill Tytla
|George GermanettiSteve Muffatti
|Carl MeyerJack Mercer
|Robert Connavale
|Herman
|
|
|Winston Sharples
|
|
|-
|43
|Leprechaun's Gold|October 14, 1949
|September 30, 1955
|Bill Tytla
|George GermanettiSteve Muffatti
|I. Klein
|Robert Little
|Paddy the Leprechaun
|
|
|Winston Sharples
|Sequel to The Wee Men (1947).
|
|-
|44
|The Song of the Birds|October 14, 1949
|
|Bill Tytla
|George GermanettiSteve Muffatti
|Bill TurnerLarry Riley
|Robert Little
|Little Audrey
|
|
|Winston Sharples
|Short is a semi-remake/reused plot of the 1934 Max Fleischer Color Classic cartoon, The Song of the Birds (1934); featuring Little Audrey.
|
|}

1950s

1960s

Home media
On January 23, 2012, Thunderbean Animation released a restored collection of public domain Noveltoons on DVD entitled Noveltoons Original Classics with the following cartoons: Cilly GooseSuddenly It's SpringYankee Doodle DonkeyScrappily MarriedA Lamb in a JamCheese BurglarSudden Fried ChickenThe Stupidstitious CatThe Enchanted SquareMuch Ado About MuttonThe Wee MenNaughty But MiceFlip FlapThe Bored CuckooLeprechauns GoldQuack-a-Doodle DooTeacher's PestUps an' Downs DerbyPleased to Eat YouSaved by the Bell.

On October 1, 2019, Thunderbean Animation re-released Noveltoons Original Classics on Blu-ray. It included the following cartoons:Cilly GooseSuddenly It's SpringYankee Doodle DonkeyScrappily MarriedA Lamb in a JamCheese BurglarOld MacDonald Had A FarmThe Stupidstitious CatThe Enchanted SquareMuch Ado About MuttonQuack-a-Doodle DooThe Wee MenNaughty But MiceFlip FlapThe Bored CuckooThe Old Shell GameTeacher's PestUps an' Downs DerbyPleased to Eat YouSaved by the Bell.

On July 6, 2021, Paramount Home Entertainment released a restored print of Space Kid on the "Paramount Presents" Blu-ray re-release of the 1982 film 48 Hrs., making it the first Paramount cartoon from the 1960s decade to be restored on any form of home media.

See also

Other animated shorts series
 Cartune Classics Looney Tunes Merrie Melodies ComiColor Cartoons Color Classics Color Rhapsodies Happy Harmonies Rainbow Parade Silly Symphony Swing Symphony Puppetoons''

Notes

References

External links

Freely downloadable Noveltoons shorts
 

American animation anthology series
Animated film series
Children's film series
Famous Studios series and characters
Film series introduced in 1943
Paramount Pictures
Television series by U.M. & M. TV Corporation